Imunny is a rural locality (a selo) in Novogeorgiyevsky Selsoviet, Tarumovsky District, Republic of Dagestan, Russia. The population was 361 as of 2010. There are 6 streets.

Geography 
Imunny is located 28 km west of Tarumovka (the district's administrative centre) by road. Arslanbek is the nearest rural locality.

References 

Rural localities in Tarumovsky District